Karl Meisl, or Carl Meisl (30 June 1775 – 8 October 1853) was an accountant in the Imperial Austrian Navy, and a dramatist.

Life
Meisl was born in Ljubljana (at that time in the Hapsburg Monarchy) in 1775, and was educated there. In 1800 he was appointed Fourier (a military officer rank); he was promoted to accounting officer and field warfare commissioner, and moved to Vienna. He rose to become accounting adviser in the naval department of the Hofkriegsrat.

Dramatic works
He wrote about 200 pieces for the stage. His first play, Carolo Carolina, appeared in 1802, and his last, Die blonden Locken, in 1844. His plays were mostly performed in the Theater in der Leopoldstadt in Vienna; leading roles were played by Ferdinand Raimund, Carl Carl, Johann Nestroy and Wenzel Scholz.

The Consecration of the House
Meisl wrote the text of the cantata Die Weihe des Hauses (The Consecration of the House), for which Ludwig van Beethoven wrote the overture; it was written to celebrate the re-opening in October 1822 of the Theater in der Josefstadt in Vienna, rebuilt by Karl Friedrich Hensler.

References

External links

1775 births
1853 deaths
Austrian male dramatists and playwrights
Military personnel from Ljubljana
19th-century Austrian dramatists and playwrights
19th-century Austrian male writers
Theatre people from Ljubljana